Minuscule 714 (in the Gregory-Aland numbering), ε1392 (von Soden), is a Greek minuscule manuscript of the New Testament, on parchment. Palaeographically it has been assigned to the 13th century. The manuscript is lacunose. Scrivener labelled it as 563e.

The manuscript contains also a fragment of Sentences of Peter Lombard.

Description 

The codex contains the text of the four Gospels, on 338 parchment leaves (size ), with one lacuna (gap in the text). 
It lacks texts of John 20:17-21:25.

The text is written in one column per page, 22 lines per page. The manuscript is ornamented, the large initial letters in red, the small initials are in red.

There is also another division according to the smaller Ammonian Sections, whose numbers are given at the margin, with references to the Eusebian Canons.

The manuscript contains the Epistula ad Carpianum, Prolegomena, the Eusebian Canon tables, lists of the  before each Gospel. It contains seven miniatures in colours on gold, four of them with symbols of the four Evangelists, and three with portraits of the Evangelists (except Luke).

It has very special liturgical directions.

The manuscript contains also a fragment of Sententiae of Peter Lombard (size 13 x 8 cm). The large initial letters in colours and gold, the small initials in blue.

The text of the manuscript was corrected by the original scribe.

Text 

The Greek text of the codex is a representative of the Byzantine text-type. Hermann von Soden classified it to the textual family Kx. Kurt Aland placed it in Category V.

According to the Claremont Profile Method it represents Kx in Luke 1 and Luke 20. In Luke 10 no profile was made.

History 

Scrivener dated the manuscript to the 13th century, Gregory dated it to the 13th or 14th century. The manuscript is dated by the INTF to the 13th century. Place of origin is unknown.

The manuscript was brought from Corfu by Dean Burgon, then belonged to W. F. Rose, and bought for the British Museum in 1893 (along with minuscule 715, 716).

It was added to the list of New Testament manuscripts by Scrivener (563) and Gregory (714). Gregory saw the manuscript in 1883. The text was collated by Rose.

The manuscript is housed at the British Library in London (Egerton MS 2783).

See also 

 List of New Testament minuscules
 Biblical manuscript
 Textual criticism

References

Further reading

External links 

 Minuscule 714 at the British Library

Greek New Testament minuscules
13th-century biblical manuscripts
Egerton collection
Illuminated biblical manuscripts